The men's tournament in basketball at the 1988 Summer Olympics in Seoul began on 17 September and ended on 30 September.

The Soviet Union won their second gold medal, defeating Yugoslavia 76–63 in the gold medal match.

This was the last Olympic basketball tournament where NBA players were not allowed to participate; FIBA instituted a rule change in 1989 that lifted that restriction, leading to the dominance of 1992's Dream Team.

Competition schedule

Qualification
A NOC could enter one men's team with 12 players. Automatic qualifications were granted to the host country and the winners from the previous edition. The remaining teams were decided by the continental championships in Asia, Oceania, Africa and Americas and European qualifying tournament. Champions of Asia and Oceania, top two teams from Africa and top three from Americas earned direct qualification. Last three berths are allocated from European qualifying tournament, held in Netherlands.

Squads

Each NOC was limited to one team per tournament. Each team had a roster of twelve players.

Group stage

Group A

Group B

Knockout stage

Championship bracket

Quarterfinals

Semifinals

Bronze medal game

Gold medal game

Classification round

5th–8th Place

9th–12th Place

 Classification 5–8 semifinals

 Classification 7–8

 Classification 5–6

 Classification 9–12 semifinals

 Classification 11–12

 Classification 9–10

Awards

Final ranking
Rankings are determined by classification games:

References

 Official Olympic Report
 USA Basketball
 1988 Olympic Games: Tournament for Men, FIBA Archive

 
Basketball at the 1988 Summer Olympics
Basketball at the Summer Olympics – Men's tournament